Thomas Griselle (1891–1955) was an American composer who wrote much chamber music. His Two American Sketches for piano won a $10,000 prize from the Victor Talking Machine Company in 1928.

References

Thomas Griselle at WorldCat

American male composers
1891 births
1955 deaths
20th-century American composers
20th-century American male musicians